The Secretary of Transportation is a member of the Virginia Governor's Cabinet. W. Sheppard Miller III is the current Secretary.

Agencies
The Secretary of Transportation overlooks the following agencies:

 Virginia Department of Aviation
 Virginia Department of Motor Vehicles
 Virginia Department of Rail and Public Transportation
 Virginia Department of Transportation
 Virginia Motor Vehicle Dealer Board
 Virginia Office of Transportation Public-Private Partnerships
 Virginia Commercial Space Flight Authority
 Virginia Port Authority

List of Secretaries of Transportation

Secretary of Transportation and Public Safety (July 1, 1972–July 1, 1976)
 Wayne A. Whitham (1972–1976)

Secretary of Transportation (July 1, 1976–July 1, 1984)
 Wayne A. Whitham (1976–1978)
 George M. Walters (1978–1982)
 Andrew B. Fogarty (1982–1984)

Secretary of Transportation and Public Safety (July 1, 1984–February 22, 1990)
 Franklin E. White (1984–1985)
 Andrew B. Fogarty (1985–1986)
 Vivian E. Watts (1986–1990)

Secretary of Transportation (February 22, 1990–present)
 John G. Milliken (1990–1994)
 Robert E. Martinez (1994–1998)
 Shirley Ybarra (1998–2002)
 Whittington W. Clement (2002–2005)
 Pierce Homer (2005–2010)
 Sean Connaughton (2010–2014)
 Aubrey Layne (2014–2018)
 Shannon Valentine (2018–2022)
 W. Sheppard Miller III (2022-present)

References

1972 establishments in Virginia
Government agencies established in 1972
Transportation
Transportation